Biotechnology and Biological Sciences Research Council (BBSRC), part of UK Research and Innovation, is a non-departmental public body (NDPB), and is the largest UK public funder of non-medical bioscience.  It predominantly funds scientific research institutes and university research departments in the UK.

Purpose
Receiving its funding through the science budget of the Department for Business, Energy and Industrial Strategy (BEIS), BBSRC's mission is to "promote and support, by any means, high-quality basic, strategic and applied research and related postgraduate training relating to the understanding and exploitation of biological systems".

Structure
BBSRC's head office is at Polaris House  in Swindon - the same building as the other councils of UK Research and Innovation, AHRC EPSRC, ESRC, Innovate UK, MRC, NERC, Research England and STFC, as well as the UKSA.  Funded by Government, BBSRC invested over £498 million in bioscience in 2017–18. BBSRC also manages the joint Research Councils' Office in Brussels – the UK Research Office (UKRO).

History
BBSRC was created in 1994, merging the former Agricultural and Food Research Council (AFRC) and taking over the biological science activities of the former Science and Engineering Research Council (SERC).

Chairs
 Sir Alistair Grant (1994-1998)
 Dr Peter Doyle CBE (1998-2003)
 Dr Peter Ringrose (2003-2009)
 Prof Sir Tom Blundell FRS (2009–2015)
 Prof Sir Gordon Duff (2015–present)

Chief executives
 Prof (now Sir) Tom Blundell FRS (1994 -1996)
 Prof Ray Baker CBE (1996-2002)
 Prof (now Dame) Julia Goodfellow CBE (2002-2007)
 Prof Douglas Kell CBE (2008–2013)
 Dr Jackie Hunter CBE (from 21 October 2013)
 Prof Melanie Welham FRSB (2016-2018)

Executive chairs

 Prof Melanie Welham FRSB (2018–present)

Governance and management
BBSRC is managed by the BBSRC Council consisting of a chair (from 2015, Professor Sir Gordon Duff), an executive chair (Professor Melanie Welham) and from ten to eighteen representatives from UK universities, government and industry.  The council approves policies, strategy, budgets and major funding.

A research panel provides expert advice which BBSRC Council draws upon in making decisions. The purpose of the research panel is to advise on:

 the development and implementation of the council's strategic plans
 the competitiveness, relevance, economic impact, and societal considerations of the science and innovation activities funded by BBSRC
 opportunities for partnership with national and international organisations

Boards, panels and committees
In addition to the council and the research panel, BBSRC has a series of other internal bodies for specific purposes.

 Appointments Board
 Remuneration Board
 Strategy Advisory Panels - eight panels advise and report to the BBSRC Executive Chair
 Research Committees - five committees award research grants in specific science areas

Institutes of BBSRC
The council strategically funds eight research institutes in the UK, and a number of centres (BBSRC: Institutes and centres).

They have strong links with business, industry and the wider community, and support policy development.

The institutes' research underpins key sectors of the UK economy such as agriculture, bioenergy, biotechnology, food and drink and pharmaceuticals. In addition, the institutes maintain unique research facilities of national importance.

 Babraham Institute (BI) (Cambridge)
 Earlham Institute (EI) (formerly The Genome Analysis Centre) (Norwich)
 The Institute of Biological, Environmental and Rural Sciences (IBERS), part of Aberystwyth University (Aberystwyth)
 John Innes Centre (JIC) (Norwich)
 The Pirbright Institute (Pirbright), formerly the Institute for Animal Health (IAH)
 Quadram Institute (Norwich), formerly the Institute of Food Research
 The Roslin Institute (RI) (Midlothian), part of the University of Edinburgh
 Rothamsted Research (Harpenden and North Wyke)

Other research institutes have merged with each other or with local universities. Previous BBSRC (or AFRC) sponsored institutes include:
 Institute of Grassland and Environmental Research (IGER - Aberystwyth), merged with the University of Aberystwyth 2008
 Letcombe Laboratory
 Long Ashton Research Station (LARS - Bristol)
 the Plant Breeding Institute (PBI - Cambridge)
 the Weed Research Organisation (WRO - Oxford)
 Silsoe Research Institute (SRI - Bedfordshire) was closed in 2006.

References

Biological research institutes in the United Kingdom
Biology education in the United Kingdom
Biotechnology in the United Kingdom
Biotechnology organizations
Department for Business, Energy and Industrial Strategy
Government agencies established in 1994
Life sciences industry
Non-departmental public bodies of the United Kingdom government
Organisations based in Swindon
Organizations established in 1994
Research councils
Research institutes in the United Kingdom
Science and technology in the United Kingdom
1994 establishments in the United Kingdom